The 2013–14 East Superleague (known as the McBookie.com East Superleague for sponsorship reasons) was the 12th season of the East Superleague, the top tier of league competition for SJFA East Region member clubs.

The season began on 10 August 2013 and ended on 14 June 2014. Linlithgow Rose were the reigning champions. The division expanded from twelve to sixteen clubs from this season.

Bo'ness United won the title on 28 May 2014. As champions they entered the preliminary round of the 2014–15 Scottish Cup where they were drawn to receive a bye to the first round.

Teams
The following teams changed division after the 2012–13 season.

To East Superleague
Promoted from East Premier League
Newtongrange Star
Ballingry Rovers
Tayport
Armadale Thistle

Stadia and locations

Managerial changes

League table

Results

East Region Super/Premier League play-off
Kelty Hearts defeated Dalkeith Thistle, who finished third in the East Premier League, 5–0 on aggregate in the East Region Super/Premier League play-off to retain their Superleague status.

References

6
East Superleague seasons